Shadow Assault: Tenchu is a 2008 action game by FromSoftware for the Xbox 360. It is a part of the Tenchu series. Shadow Assault: Tenchu received mixed reviews from critics.

Gameplay
The game places the player in charge of one of several selectable characters from the Tenchu universe. Players are given a task to complete on the level, playing out much like Bomberman, where players must place ninja traps and other items on the field for enemies to run afoul of.

Enemies in the game have a hit point total, displayed above their heads, and a line of sight grid, shown as yellow squares over the regular terrain. When a player is spotted by a unit, its sight turns to red squares, and it begins to chase the player. After a time, if the player has yet to be reacquired by the enemy, it will return to its original pathfinding.

Reception

Shadow Assault: Tenchu received "mixed or average" reviews, according to review aggregator Metacritic.

References

External links
 Official website

2008 video games
Action video games
FromSoftware games
Multiplayer online games
Puzzle video games
Tenchu games
Video game spin-offs
Video games developed in Japan
Xbox 360 Live Arcade games
Xbox 360-only games
Multiplayer and single-player video games
Xbox 360 games